Elio Morille (7 September 1927 – 21 June 1998) was an Italian rower who competed in the 1948 Summer Olympics and in the 1952 Summer Olympics.

He was born in Alessandria in 1927. A worker at the Italian motorbike manufacturer Moto Guzzi based at their plant in Mandello del Lario, he became a member of the company's rowing team, Canottieri Moto Guzzi. A coxless four was formed with Giuseppe Moioli, Morille, Giovanni Invernizzi, and Franco Faggi. The first time they left their home training ground, Lake Como, was when they travelled to the 1947 European Rowing Championships in Lucerne, Switzerland. Little known in rowing circles, they unexpectedly won the gold medal in their boat class. The four were to dominate this boat class until 1952, continuously winning all races they rowed including all heats. In 1948 he was a crew member of the Italian boat which won the gold medal in the coxless fours event. Four years later he was eliminated with the Italian boat in the semi-final repêchage of the coxless four competition.

He died in Rome in 1998.

References

1927 births
1998 deaths
Italian male rowers
Olympic rowers of Italy
Rowers at the 1948 Summer Olympics
Rowers at the 1952 Summer Olympics
Olympic gold medalists for Italy
People from Alessandria
Olympic medalists in rowing
Medalists at the 1948 Summer Olympics
European Rowing Championships medalists
Sportspeople from the Province of Alessandria